Ingrave is a village and former civil parish in the Brentwood in Essex, England. It is situated on and around the A128 road, 2 miles (3.2 km) southeast of the town of Brentwood. Together with the adjoining village of Herongate, it now forms the Herongate and Ingrave civil parish. In 1931 the parish had a population of 692. On 1 January 1937 the parish was abolished and merged with Brentwood.

Name and history
Ingrave's name is derived from that of the original manor in this area, "Ging-Ralph" or "Ralph’s-ing". The manor was originally owned by the Mordaunt family but was acquired by the Petre family in 1573. The Petres built Thorndon Hall (now luxury apartments) on the site in 1770.

References

External links

Villages in Essex
Former civil parishes in Essex
Borough of Brentwood